The Anglo-French Convention of 1898, full name the Convention between Great Britain and France for the Delimitation of their respective Possessions to the West of the Niger, and of their respective Possessions and Spheres of Influence to the East of that River, also known as the Niger Convention, was an agreement between Britain and France that concluded the partition of West Africa between the colonial powers by finally fixing the borders in the disputed areas of Northern Nigeria. It was signed in Paris on 14 June 1898, ratifications were exchanged on 13 June 1899.

Article IV of this convention was completed by a declaration signed in London on 21 March 1899 that, after the Fashoda Incident, delimited spheres of influence in northern Central Africa and the Sudan.

See also
 Anglo-French Convention of 1882
 Anglo-French Convention of 1889
 Entente Cordiale

References

Further reading
Correspondance et documents relatifs à la convention franco-anglaise du 14 juin 1898, 1890–1898. Paris: Ministère des affaires étrangères / Imprimerie nationale, 1899 (Documents diplomatiques) (also on archive.org; in French and English)
Boniface I. Obichere, West African States and European Expansion: The Dahomey-Niger Hinterland, 1885–1898. New Haven: Yale University Press, 1971, chapter 8
G. N. Uzoigwe, Britain and the Conquest of Africa: The Age of Salisbury. Ann Arbor: University of Michigan Press, 1974, chapters 5 and 6

External links
Text of the 1898 convention in: The Map of Africa by Treaty, 3rd ed. London: His Majesty's Stationery Office / Harrison and Sons, 1909, vol. 2, pp. 785–793
Text of the 1899 declaration in: op. cit., pp. 796–797
Map in: Déclaration additionnelle du 21 mars 1899 à la convention franco-anglaise du 14 juin 1898. Paris: Ministère des affaires étrangères / Imprimerie nationale, 1899 (Documents diplomatiques), n. pag.

Colonial Nigeria
France–United Kingdom treaties
1898 in politics
Treaties of the United Kingdom (1801–1922)
1898 treaties